Laura Montalvo (born 29 March 1976) is an Argentine former professional tennis player.

Montalvo won eight ITF singles titles and reached a career high of No. 191 in singles in June 1995. Her win–loss record for singles is 143–76, 266–152 for doubles. Being a "doubles specialist" on the WTA Tour, she reached the ranking of No. 23 in doubles in May 2001. She played on doubles teams with both Liezel Huber and Paola Suárez. With Huber, she reached the quarterfinals of the French Open in 2000. They regularly competed together in Grand Slam tournaments and tour events for the next two years. She also frequently partnered her countrywoman Suárez, including at the 2000 Sydney Olympics, where they lost in the second round. The pair won eight titles together, which make up all but one of Montalvo's total title haul in doubles.

WTA Career Finals

Doubles (9–5)

ITF Circuit finals

Singles (8–5)

Doubles (20–12)

References

External links
 
 
 

1976 births
Living people
Argentine female tennis players
Olympic tennis players of Argentina
Tennis players from Buenos Aires
Tennis players at the 2000 Summer Olympics
20th-century Argentine women